Hubert Laws (born  November 10, 1939) is an American flutist and saxophonist with a career spanning over 50 years in jazz, classical, and other music genres. He is one of the most recognized and respected jazz flutists in the history of jazz.  Laws is one of the few classical artists who has also mastered jazz, pop, and rhythm-and-blues genres, moving effortlessly from one repertory to another.

As leader

As sideman
With Roy Ayers
Stoned Soul Picnic (Atlantic, 1968)
Daddy Bug (Atlantic, 1969)
With Chet Baker
She Was Too Good to Me (1972)
You Can't Go Home Again (Horizon, 1977) 
The Best Thing for You (A&M, 1977 [1989])
Studio Trieste (1982)
With George Benson
Tell It Like It Is (A&M/CTI, 1969)
The Other Side of Abbey Road (A&M/CTI, 1969)
White Rabbit (CTI, 1972)
Good King Bad (CTI, 1975)
In Concert-Carnegie Hall (CTI, 1975)
Pacific Fire (CTI, 1983)
With Kenny Burrell
God Bless the Child (CTI, 1971)
With Ron Carter
Uptown Conversation (Embryo, 1970)
Blues Farm (CTI, 1973)
Spanish Blue (CTI, 1974)
Anything Goes (Kudu, 1975)
New York Slick (Milestone, 1979)
 Empire Jazz (RSO, 1980)
With Chick Corea
The Complete "Is" Sessions (1969)
Tap Step (1980)
 The Ultimate Adventure (2006)
With Paul Desmond
From the Hot Afternoon (A&M/CTI, 1969)
With Charles Earland
Intensity (Prestige, 1972)
With Gil Evans
Blues in Orbit (Enja, 1971)
With Gil Scott-Heron
 Pieces of a Man (Flying Dutchman, 1971)
With Astrud Gilberto
Gilberto with Turrentine with Stanley Turrentine (CTI, 1971)
With Grant Green
The Main Attraction (CTI, 1976)
With Johnny Hammond
The Prophet (Kudu, 1972)
With Eddie Henderson
Mahal (Capitol, 1978)
With Freddie Hubbard
First Light (CTI, 1971)
Sky Dive (CTI, 1972)
With Bobby Hutcherson
Highway One (Columbia, 1978)
Conception: The Gift of Love (Columbia, 1979)
With Solomon Ilori
African High Life (Blue Note, 1964)
With Jackie and Roy
Time & Love (CTI, 1972)
A Wilder Alias (CTI, 1973)
With Milt Jackson
Milt Jackson and the Hip String Quartet (Verve, 1968)
Goodbye (CTI, 1973)
Feelings (Pablo, 1976)
With The Jazz Crusaders
Chile Con Soul (Pacific Jazz, 1965)
With Quincy Jones
Walking in Space (A&M, 1969)
Gula Matari (A&M, 1970)
Smackwater Jack (A&M, 1971)
Body Heat (A&M, 1974)
Mellow Madness (A&M, 1975)
Sounds...and Stuff Like That!! (A&M, 1978)
With Harold Mabern
Greasy Kid Stuff! (Prestige, 1970)
With Junior Mance
I Believe to My Soul (Atlantic, 1968)
With Herbie Mann
Glory of Love (CTI, 1967)
With Arif Mardin
Journey (Atlantic, 1974)
With Gary McFarland
America the Beautiful, An Account of its Disappearance (1968)
Today (1969)
With Helen Merrill and Dick Katz
A Shade of Difference (Milestone, 1968)With James MoodyGreat Day (Argo, 1963)With Airto MoreiraFree (CTI, 1972)With Alphonse MouzonMorning Sun (1981)With Milton NascimentoCourage (A&M/CTI, 1969)With Jaco Pastorius Jaco Pastorius (Epic, 1976)With Houston PersonBroken Windows, Empty Hallways (Prestige, 1972)With Dave PikeManhattan Latin (Decca, 1964)With Joe SampleCarmel (GRP, 1979)With Mongo SantamaríaMongomania (Columbia, 1967)With Lalo SchifrinBlack Widow (CTI, 1976)With Don SebeskyGiant Box (CTI, 1973)With Melvin SparksAkilah! (Prestige, 1972)With Leon SpencerBad Walking Woman (Prestige, 1972)
Where I'm Coming From (Prestige, 1973)With Gábor SzabóMizrab (CTI, 1972)With CTI All-StarsCalifornia Concert (CTI, 1972)With Bobby TimmonsGot to Get It! (Milestone, 1967)With Cal TjaderThe Prophet (Verve, 1967)With Stanley TurrentineNightwings (Fantasy, 1977)
If I Could (MusicMasters, 1993)With McCoy TynerFly with the Wind (Milestone, 1976)
Together (Milestone, 1978)
La Leyenda de La Hora (Columbia, 1981)With Walter WanderleyWhen It Was Done (A&M/CTI, 1968)
Moondreams (A&M/CTI, 1969)With Randy WestonBlue Moses (CTI, 1972)With Gerald WilsonMonterey Moods (Mack Avenue, 2007)With Kai WindingPenny Lane & Time (Verve, 1967)With Stevie WonderA Time to Love (Motown, 2005)

 As a producer With Debra Laws Very Special (Spy, 1981)With Eloise Laws The Key (Scepterstein Records, 1999)With Cheryl Lynn' Got to Be Real: The Columbia Anthology'' (Soulmusic Records, 2019)

Notes

References

Discographies of American artists
Jazz discographies